Belton School District #124 is a public school district with its headquarters located in Belton, Missouri.  The organization oversees nine schools and in the 2021-2022 has a total enrollment of 4,213 students PreK-12.

The district includes most of Belton, Loch Lloyd, and Riverview Estates.

List of schools in the district

High school
Belton High School (grades 9-12)

Middle School
Belton Middle School (grades 7-8)

Elementary schools
Cambridge Elementary (grades K-4)
Gladden Elementary (grades K-4)
Wilckens STEAM Academy at Hillcrest (grades K-6)
Kentucky Trail Elementary (grades K-4)
Mill Creek Upper Elementary (grades 5-6)

Special Services/Other Sites
Scott Education Center (grades K-12)
Grace Early Child Care and Education Center (PreK)
Yeokum Center of Innovation

Image gallery

See also
List of school districts in Missouri

References

School districts in Missouri
Education in Cass County, Missouri